Neville Liyanage (born 9 October 1975) is a Sri Lankan cricketer who now plays for the Malaysian cricket team. He made his first-class cricket debut for Singha Sports Club on 29 December 2005. He made almost 80 appearances in first-class and List A cricket in Sri Lanka between 2005 and 2011.

In June 2019, he was named in Malaysia's squad for the 2019 Malaysia Tri-Nation Series tournament. He made his Twenty20 International (T20I) debut for Malayasia, against Thailand, on 24 June 2019.

References

External links
 

1975 births
Living people
Malaysian cricketers
Malaysia Twenty20 International cricketers
Sri Lankan cricketers
Singha Sports Club cricketers
People from Kalutara District
Sri Lankan emigrants to Malaysia
Sri Lankan expatriates in Malaysia